The Colorado State Rams football team represents Colorado State University in the Mountain West Conference at the NCAA Division I FBS level in college football. Colorado State has played in over 1,000 games in over a century of play, including 17 bowl games. The following are the yearly results, game-by-game yearly results, and detailed bowl results of the team. The Rams had interruptions occur from 1895–1898 and 1943–1944.

Yearly results

References

Colorado State Rams

Colorado State Rams football seasons